The Association québécoise des critiques de cinéma (AQCC) is a Canadian organization of film critics from Quebec.

Formed in 1973, the organization currently presents two annual awards, the Prix Luc-Perreault for best Quebec film of the year and an award for best international film of the year, as well as sponsoring awards at various Quebec film festivals, including the Fantasia Film Festival, the Saguenay International Short Film Festival, the Montreal International Documentary Festival and the Festival du nouveau cinéma.

The organization's current president is Claire Valade, a critic for the film journals Panorama-cinéma and Séquences.

In 2013, the organization celebrated its 40th anniversary by sponsoring a special screening series of classic Quebec films at the Cinémathèque québécoise.

Awards

Best International Film

References

External links

Canadian film critics associations
Organizations based in Montreal
1973 establishments in Quebec